Prauserella soli is a bacterium from the genus Prauserella which has been isolated from crude oil-contaminated soil in Kuwait. Prauserella soli has the ability to degrade crude oil.

References

Pseudonocardiales
Bacteria described in 2015